Lee Chung-ah (born October 29, 1984) is a South Korean actress. She is best known for her leading roles in the films Temptation of Wolves (2004) and My Tutor Friend 2 (2007), as well as the cable dramas Cool Guys, Hot Ramen (2011) and VIP (2019).

Career
Lee Chung-ah began her acting career by playing supporting roles in the films Resurrection of the Little Match Girl (2002) and Happy Ero Christmas (2003). In 2004, she landed her first leading role in Temptation of Wolves (2004), a film adaptation of an internet novel by Guiyeoni. Lee played a country girl who moves to the city and attracts the attention of the two most popular boys in town, played by Jo Han-sun and Kang Dong-won. The film made the two actors into breakout stars, but not Lee.

She was cast as a lead actress in her first television drama Let's Go to the Beach (2005), where she and Lee Wan played bickering lifeguards who later fall in love. In 2006, Lee starred in the family drama Going Together and the omnibus film Ssunday Seoul.

Lee then starred in My Tutor Friend 2 (2007), the sequel to the 2003 hit film of the same title. She studied Nihongo for her role as a Japanese exchange student who goes to Korea in search of her first love, then meets a happy-go-lucky university student (Park Ki-woong) who becomes her Korean language tutor. A year later, she was cast in Kim Jee-woon's kimchi western The Good, the Bad, the Weird (2008) in a small role as the foster sister of Jung Woo-sung's character. Lee said that she practiced horseback riding for this film but those scenes were deleted in post-production. She later showed her horseback riding skills in Chosun Police Season 2, a series set during the reign of Emperor Gojong in which she played a damo with a dark past.

On television, Lee continued to appear in supporting roles in 2009 with the romantic comedy The Accidental Couple and family drama Jolly Widows. This was followed by the 2010 daily drama Pure Pumpkin Flower, where she played a pure-hearted girl who never loses hope even in difficult circumstances.

In 2011, she starred in the leading role in cable romantic comedy series Cool Guys, Hot Ramen. Lee played a college girl preparing for teacher certification examination who unexpectedly inherits her father's ramen restaurant; she becomes involved in a love triangle with two of her employees, the arrogant heir to the biggest food conglomerate in Korea (Jung Il-woo) and a lazy but warm-heated genius chef (Lee Ki-woo). Cool Guys, Hot Ramen received solid ratings for a Korean cable drama, and became the first of tvN's "flower boy" programming, which included Dating Agency: Cyrano on which Lee made a guest appearance in 2013.

Lee was in two variety shows in 2012. She hosted Cats and Dogs, a talk show in which pet owners shared information to foster a more mature pet culture. Lee then appeared in the second season of Music and Lyrics, a reality show in which a celebrity pair write and compose a song together. She wrote the lyrics and actor Seo Ji-seok composed the music for the ballad "Looking Forward to It," which was sung by Heo Young-saeng and used as the theme song of Seo In-guk's character in the family drama The Sons.

Lee reunited with Happy Ero Christmas costar Kim Sun-a in the 2013 revenge thriller The Five. Adapted from the webtoon of the same title, she played a detective with a delinquent credit history who helps kill a serial killer in exchange for an organ transplant for her ill mother. Later in the year, she played a doormat wife in the weekend drama series Wonderful Mama.

In 2019, Lee returned to small screen with office mystery drama VIP.

In July 2021, Lee signed a contract with J-Wide Company.

In 2022, Lee appeared in the SBS drama One Dollar Lawyer.

Personal life
Her father is musical theatre actor Lee Seung-chul.

She began dating actor Lee Ki-woo in 2013; they were costars in the 2011 series Cool Guys, Hot Ramen and broke up in 2019.

Filmography

Film

Television series

Web series

Television show

Music video

Ambassadorship 
 Ambassador for the 1st Ulsan International Film Festival (2021)

Awards and nominations

Listicles

References

External links
 
 
 
 

1984 births
Living people
King Kong by Starship artists
People from Ansan
South Korean television actresses
South Korean film actresses